Keven Matteo Schlotterbeck (born 28 April 1997) is a German professional footballer who plays as a centre-back for Bundesliga club VfL Bochum on loan from SC Freiburg.

Career
Schlotterbeck made his professional debut for SC Freiburg in the Bundesliga on 3 February 2019, coming on as a substitute in the 38th minute for Manuel Gulde in the 2–2 away draw against VfB Stuttgart.

At the end of the 2019–20 season, Schlotterbeck returned to SC Freiburg after his season-long loan with Union Berlin ended.

On 2 January 2023, he joined VfL Bochum on loan until the end of the 2022–23 season.

Personal life
Schlotterbeck is the nephew of former professional footballer Niels Schlotterbeck, who also played for Freiburg. His younger brother, Nico, is also a professional footballer and played alongside Keven at SC Freiburg.

References

External links
 
 
 TSG Backnang statistics at Fussball.de 
 TSG Backnang II statistics at Fussball.de 

1997 births
Living people
German footballers
Association football defenders
Olympic footballers of Germany
Footballers at the 2020 Summer Olympics
SC Freiburg II players
SC Freiburg players
1. FC Union Berlin players
VfL Bochum players
Bundesliga players
Regionalliga players
People from Rems-Murr-Kreis
Sportspeople from Stuttgart (region)